Railway stations in Vietnam include

North–South railway

Hanoi–Haiphong railway

Bac Hong - Van Dien Railway

Hanoi-Dong Dang Railway

Hanoi–Lào Cai railway

References 

 
Vietnam
Railway station
Railway stations